There have been two baronetcies created for members of the Montefiore family, both in the Baronetage of the United Kingdom. Both creations are extinct.

The Montefiore Baronetcy, of East Cliff Lodge in the Isle of Thanet and County of Kent, was created in the Baronetage of the United Kingdom on 23 July 1846 for the Jewish banker and philanthropist Moses Montefiore in recognition of his services to humanitarian causes on behalf of the Jewish people. He was childless and the title became extinct on his death in 1885.

The Montefiore Baronetcy, of Worth Park in the Parish of Worth in the County of Sussex, was created in the Baronetage of the United Kingdom on 16 February 1886 for Francis Abraham Montefiore. He was the grandson of Abraham Montefiore, brother of Sir Moses Montefiore, 1st Baronet (see above). The title became extinct on his death in 1935.

Montefiore baronets, of East Cliff Lodge (1846)
Sir Moses Montefiore, 1st Baronet (1784–1885)

Montefiore baronets, of Worth Park (1886)
Sir Francis Abraham Montefiore, 1st Baronet (1860–1935)

References

Extinct baronetcies in the Baronetage of the United Kingdom